Solonaima is a genus of leafhoppers in the family, Cixiidae, first described by George Willis Kirkaldy in 1906. The type species is Solonaima solonaima.

The Australian species are found in New South Wales and Queensland.

Species

Solonaima baylissa  a b
Solonaima bifurca  a b
Solonaima cedrivula  a b
Solonaima halos  a b
Solonaima irvini  a b
Solonaima minuta  a b
Solonaima monteithia  a b
Solonaima nielseni  a b
Solonaima ornata  a b
Solonaima pallescens  a b
Solonaima pholetor  a
Solonaima riocampa  a b
Solonaima solonaima  a b
Solonaima stonei  a b
Solonaima sullivani  a b
Data sources: a = GBIF, 
b = IRMNG

References

Cixiidae
Taxa described in 1906
Taxa named by George Willis Kirkaldy